Vuko Vukadinović (11 August 1937 – 3 November 1993) was a member of the League of Communists of Montenegro and the President of the Executive Council of the Socialist Republic of Montenegro from 1986 to 1989.

References

1937 births
1993 deaths
League of Communists of Montenegro politicians
Montenegrin communists